Wonju Airport is an airport in Hoengseong County, Gangwon province, South Korea . During the Korean War it was designated K-46 (Hoengseong Air Base) by the United States Air Force. In 2011, 70,943 passengers used the airport, which is mainly for military use.

Only one parking position is large enough for a Boeing 737-900. The airport has a daily scheduled flight two times, currently operated by Jin Air to Jeju.

Because Wonju Airport is sharing with military, taking photograph or video of apron, runway and military facility is strictly prohibited.

Wonju Airport's passenger terminal is 1.5 km from the airport runway, requiring passengers to take a shuttle (about 20 minutes) to their aircraft.

Airlines and destinations

Ground transportation

Bus
 ● No. 2 : Hoengseong Bus Terminal ↔ Wonju Airport ↔ Wonju station ↔ Wonju City ↔ Gwanseol-dong
 ● No. 2-1 : Hoengseong Bus Terminal ↔ Wonju Airport ↔ Wonju City ↔ Gwanseol-dong

References

Airports in South Korea
Transport in Wonju
Buildings and structures in Gangwon Province, South Korea
Airports established in 1997
1997 establishments in South Korea
20th-century architecture in South Korea